Negreum is a genus of ground beetles in the family Carabidae. There are about 15 described species in Negreum, found in eastern Asia.

Species
These 15 species belong to the genus Negreum:

 Negreum amagisanum (Morita, 1994)  (Japan)
 Negreum asakoae (Morita, 1994)  (Japan)
 Negreum bentonis (Bates, 1883)  (Japan)
 Negreum bicolore Morvan, 2006  (China)
 Negreum ehikoense (Habu, 1954)  (Japan)
 Negreum kulti (Jedlicka, 1940)  (Taiwan)
 Negreum lianzhouense Morvan & Tian, 2001  (China)
 Negreum morvani Lassalle, 1997  (China)
 Negreum mutator (Bates, 1883)  (Japan)
 Negreum nanlingense Morvan & Tian, 2001  (China)
 Negreum peliotes (Habu, 1974)  (Japan)
 Negreum qiongxiense Morvan & Tian, 2001  (China)
 Negreum rougemonti Morvan, 1998  (Thailand)
 Negreum wangmini Morvan & Tian, 2001  (China)
 Negreum yasuii (Habu, 1974)  (Japan)

References

Platyninae